Barbara Frietchie is a 1924 American silent war drama film about an old woman who helps out soldiers during the American Civil War. It is based on the play of the same name by Clyde Fitch that had starred Julia Marlowe at the turn of the century which in turn was taken from the real-life story of Barbara Fritchie. There were two silent film versions, a 1915 version and 1924 version. The 1915 version, directed by Herbert Blaché, starred Mary Miles Minter and Anna Q. Nilsson. The 1924 version, directed by Lambert Hillyer, starred Florence Vidor and Edmund Lowe.

Lydia Knott, mother of director Hillyer and a well known character actress in her own right, appears quite prominently in this film as a member of the Frietchie family but for some reason she is uncredited.

Cast

Preservation
Copies of Barbara Frietchie are held by Library and Archives Canada, UCLA Film and Television Archive, and George Eastman Museum Motion Picture Collection.

References

External links

Stills at silenthollywood.com

American silent feature films
1915 films
1924 films
1924 drama films
Silent American drama films
American Civil War films
Drama films based on actual events
American black-and-white films
Producers Distributing Corporation films
Films directed by Lambert Hillyer
1910s American films
1920s American films